Jin Wan Plaza 9 is a supertall skyscraper in Tianjin, China. Construction started in 2011 and was completed in 2017. The building will consist of hotels and offices and is one of three buildings in the Jin Wan Plaza complex.

References

Buildings and structures under construction in China
Skyscraper office buildings in Tianjin
Skyscraper hotels in Tianjin
Skyscrapers in Tianjin